The Stadstekenacademie ("City Drawing Academy", contemporaneous spelling: Stads Teekenacademie, Teeken-Academie or Akademie der Teekenkunst) was an 18th-century art academy in Amsterdam. It was the precursor of the Koninklijke Academie (established 1822) and the Rijksakademie van beeldende kunsten (established 1870). Other Dutch towns such as Haarlem also had a drawing academy.

Artists such as Cornelis Apostool, Jan Willem Pieneman and Wouter Johannes van Troostwijk were educated at the academy.

The primary intention was not to train students to become artists, but rather to bring youth into contact with art as part of their education. There was no formal structure to the education, although students were divided into three stages and were required to attended classes twice a week.  The academy organised a yearly drawing competition, awarding the winners gold, silver and bronze medals.
  
The academy had a number of "honorary members" — non-artists, usually wealthy, influential regenten (members of the ruling class), who could ensure that the academy would be properly housed, and who could finance art supplies and the prizes of the annual competition. In exchange, the regenten received social status from their honorary membership. They could also use the academy for social gatherings, or to receive foreign guests in an impressive manner.

History 
The academy was established in 1718 as the Oefenschool der Tekenkunst ("practice school of draughtsmanship"). In 1741, the school was renamed Tekenacademie on the initiative of Jan Maurits Quinkhard and others. The early history was marked by frequent arguments between members, which led most to abandon the school again. However, a new start was made in 1750 with 20 artists and regenten who were art collectors or patrons to the arts.

The Stadstekenacademie was housed in a former city gate, the Leidsepoort, as seen on a 1764 print by Reinier Vinkeles. On 4 December 1767 the school related to two chambers in the Amsterdam town hall.

The academy did not have any formal structure until 1765. From that year onwards, non-artists were also asked to serve as director of the school. In 1766-1767 the academy counted 49 artist members and 25 honorary members (non-artists) — a sign that, one year after the formalisation, the academy was doing well.

The school continued to exist until 1822, when King William I of the Netherlands established the Koninklijke Academie ("royal academy"), succeeded in 1870 by the Rijksakademie van beeldende kunsten ("state academy of fine arts").

Members

Founders, directors and teachers 
 Jurriaen Andriessen
 Jacobus Buys
 Hendrick van Cuychem
 Jacob Otten Husly
 Jacques Kuyper
 Pieter Louw
 Hendrik Meijer
 Wouda Piera
 Cornelis Ploos van Amstel
 Jan Maurits Quinkhard 
 Izaak Riewert Schmidt
 Reinier Vinkeles
 Jan Wandelaar
 Jacob de Wit
 Anthonie Ziesenis

Students 
 Cornelis Apostool
 Cornelis Borsteegh
 Egbert van Drielst
 Jan Bulthuis
 Abraham Pietersz. Hulk
 Jan Ekels the Younger
 Jacques Kuyper
 Jan Adriaan Antonie de Lelie
 Jacob Maurer
 Hermanus Numan
 Bernard Picart
 Jan Willem Pieneman
 Dirk Sluyter
 Jacob Smies
 Pieter Tanjé
 Wouter Johannes van Troostwijk

Further reading 
 Paul Knolle, "Amsterdamse stadstekenacademie, een 18de-eeuwse 'oefenschool' voor modeltekenaars, Met een lijst van redevoeringen", in A. Martis, H. Miedema, E. van Uitert (ed.), Kunstonderwijs in Nederland, Haarlem, 1980 (Dutch)
 J. Offerhaus, "Van Isaac en Apollo. De prijswinnende tekeningen van de Amsterdamse stadstekenacademie", Nederlands Kunsthistorisch Jaarboek 30 (1979), pp. 43–48 (Dutch)

References 

Art schools in the Netherlands
Schools in Amsterdam
Culture in Amsterdam
18th century in Amsterdam
Drawing
Organizations established in 1718
Educational institutions established in 1718
Arts organizations established in the 18th century